The 1982 Cork Intermediate Hurling Championship was the 73rd staging of the Cork Intermediate Hurling Championship since its establishment by the Cork County Board in 1909.

On 17 October 1982, Milford won the championship following a 4-07 to 1-05 defeat of Erin's Own in the final at Páirc Mac Gearailt. It remains their only championship title.

Cloughduv's Don O'Leary was the championship's top scorer with 4-14.

Results

First round

Second round

Quarter-finals

Semi-finals

Final

Championship statistics

Top scorers

Overall

In a single game

References

Cork Intermediate Hurling Championship
Cork Intermediate Hurling Championship